Gentianella uliginosa is a species of flowering plant belonging to the family Gentianaceae.

It is native to Europe.

References

uliginosa